Erythrina madagascariensis is a species of legume in the family Fabaceae. It is found only in Madagascar.

References

madagascariensis
Endemic flora of Madagascar
Least concern plants
Taxonomy articles created by Polbot